Maitzborn Airfield is a former military airfield located 1.7 km east-southeast of Kirchberg in Rhineland-Palatinate, Germany.

History
The airfield's origins are undetermined.  Maitzborn  was captured by the United States Army in March 1945 as part of the Western Allied invasion of Germany.  The airfield was repaired by IX Engineering Command, Ninth Air Force into an Army Air Forces advanced Landing Ground, designated Y-70. Air Force units used the airfield as a casualty evacuation and combat resupply airfield by the IX Air Force Service Command. After the German Capitulation on 8 May, it was abandoned.

References 
 Johnson, David C. (1988), U.S. Army Air Forces Continental Airfields (ETO), D-Day to V-E Day; Research Division, USAF Historical Research Center, Maxwell AFB, Alabama.

World War II airfields in Germany
1945 disestablishments in Germany
Airports in Rhineland-Palatinate